Tiffany Pham (born 27 November 1986) is an American entrepreneur, TV and film personality, author, and artist.

Education

Tiffany Pham graduated with distinction from Yale University and Harvard Business School.

Career

Tiffany Pham is the founder of Mogul, a global diversity recruitment company. The company is backed by investors SoftBank Group and the Hearst Corporation.

Pham has been named one of Forbes "30 Under 30" in Media, Business Insider "30 Most Important Women Under 30" in Technology, ELLE Magazine "30 Women Under 30 Who Are Changing the World," Entrepreneur Magazine "100 Most Powerful Women," Inc. Magazine "Top 100 Female Founders," and Crain's Magazine "40 Under 40."

Pham has appeared in advertising campaigns for Dell, Captain Morgan, Visa, LUNA, Bumble and bumble, GoDaddy, and Asana. In 2019, Pham modeled in a campaign for Caleres shoe brand Naturalizer, alongside supermodels Cameron Russell and Flaviana Matata. In 2020, Pham appeared in the first major campaign by Audible alongside fashion designer Isaac Mizrahi. From 2021 to 2022, Pham became the face of Lexus and starred in their TV advertisement campaign called "More Than Intelligence". 

Pham is a cast member of The History Channel TV shows The Machines That Built America and The Toys That Built America. She is also a judge on the TLC TV show Girl Starter, executive produced by Al Roker, and Co-Host of the show The Positive Pushback from Jonathan Faulhaber, Veteran Producer and Director of The View. 

Pham is the co-producer of Girlfriend (2010 film), which premiered at Toronto International Film Festival, Funny Bunny (South by Southwest 2015), and AWOL (Tribeca Film Festival 2016). In 2013, Pham co-founded the Beijing International Screenwriting Competition with the Beijing government.

Pham is the author of the book From Business Strategy to Information Technology Roadmap: A Practical Guide for Executives and Board Members, published by CRC Press in 2013. She is also the author of the Wall Street Journal Bestselling book You Are a Mogul, published by Simon & Schuster in the United States in 2018, Penguin Random House in the UK and British Commonwealth in 2019, Alpha Books in Asia in 2020, and Matar Publishing in the Middle East in 2022. She is also the author of book Girl Mogul, published by Macmillan Publishers in 2019.

References

American women company founders
American women chief executives
Harvard Business School alumni
1986 births
Living people
21st-century American women